Siphona is a genus of flies in the family Tachinidae.

Aphantorhaphopsis and Ceranthia are sometimes considered subgenera of Siphona, though most European workers seem content that these are genera in their own right.

Species

Siphona abbreviata (Villeneuve, 1915)
Siphona akidnomyia O'Hara, 1983
Siphona albocincta (Villeneuve, 1942)
Siphona amoena (Mesnil, 1952)
Siphona amplicornis Mesnil, 1959
Siphona angusta Mesnil, 1959
Siphona antennalis (Mesnil, 1952)
Siphona antennata (O'Hara, 1984)
Siphona arizonica (Townsend, 1919)
Siphona atoma (Reinhard, 1947)
Siphona atricapilla Mesnil, 1959
Siphona bevisi Curran, 1941
Siphona bilineata (Mesnil, 1952)
Siphona boreata Mesnil, 1960
Siphona brevirostris Coquillett, 1897
Siphona brunnea O'Hara, 1983
Siphona capensis Curran, 1941
Siphona collini Mesnil, 1960
Siphona conata (Reinhard, 1959)
Siphona confusa Mesnil, 1961
Siphona cothurnata (Mesnil, 1952)
Siphona creberrima (Speiser, 1910)
Siphona cristata (Fabricius, 1805)
Siphona cuthbertsoni Curran, 1941
Siphona efflatouni Mesnil, 1960
Siphona flavifrons Stæger, 1849
Siphona floridensis O'Hara, 1983
Siphona foliacea (Mesnil, 1953)
Siphona fuliginea Mesnil, 1977
Siphona futilis Wulp, 1890
Siphona gedeana Wulp, 1896
Siphona geniculata (De Geer, 1776)
Siphona gracilis (Mesnil, 1952)
Siphona grandistylum Pandellé, 1894
Siphona griseola Mesnil, 1970
Siphona hokkaidensis Mesnil, 1957
Siphona hungarica Andersen, 1984
Siphona hurdi (Reinhard, 1959)
Siphona illinoiensis Townsend, 1891
Siphona immaculata Andersen, 1996
Siphona infuscata (Mesnil, 1952)
Siphona ingerae Andersen, 1982
Siphona intrudens (Curran, 1932)
Siphona juniperi (O'Hara, 1984)
Siphona kairiensis O'Hara, 1983
Siphona kuscheli (Cortés, 1952)
Siphona lindneri Mesnil, 1959
Siphona longissima O'Hara, 1983
Siphona lurida Reinhard, 1943
Siphona lutea (Townsend, 1919)
Siphona macronyx O'Hara, 1983
Siphona maculata Stæger, 1849
Siphona maderensis Smit & Zeegers, 2002
Siphona medialis O'Hara, 1983
Siphona melania (Bezzi, 1908)
Siphona melanura Mesnil, 1959
Siphona multifaria O'Hara, 1983
Siphona munroi Curran, 1941
Siphona murina (Mesnil, 1952)
Siphona nigricans (Villeneuve, 1930)
Siphona nigrohalterata Mesnil, 1959
Siphona nigroseta Curran, 1941
Siphona nobilis (Mesnil, 1953)
Siphona obesa (Mesnil, 1952)
Siphona obscuripennis Curran, 1941
Siphona oligomyia O'Hara, 1983
Siphona pacifica O'Hara, 1983
Siphona paludosa Mesnil, 1960
Siphona patellipalpis (Mesnil, 1952)
Siphona pauciseta Rondani, 1865
Siphona perispoliata (Mesnil, 1953)
Siphona phantasma (Mesnil, 1952)
Siphona pigra Mesnil, 1977
Siphona pilistyla Andersen, 1996
Siphona pisinnia O'Hara, 1983
Siphona plusiae Coquillett, 1895
Siphona pretoriana O’Hara & Cerretti, 2016
Siphona pseudomaculata Blanchard, 1963
Siphona reducta (Mesnil, 1952)
Siphona rizaba O'Hara, 1983
Siphona rossica Mesnil, 1961
Siphona rubrapex Mesnil, 1977
Siphona rubrica (Mesnil, 1952)
Siphona selecta (Pandellé, 1894)
Siphona setinerva (Mesnil, 1952)
Siphona setosa Mesnil, 1960
Siphona seyrigi Mesnil, 1960
Siphona simulans (Mesnil, 1952)
Siphona singularis (Wiedemann, 1830)
Siphona sola Mesnil, 1959
Siphona sonorensis (O'Hara, 1984)
Siphona spinulosa (Mesnil, 1952)
Siphona subarctica Andersen, 1996
Siphona trichaeta (Mesnil, 1952)
Siphona tropica (Townsend, 1915
Siphona unispina (Mesnil, 1952)
Siphona uruhuasi (Townsend, 1927)
Siphona variata Andersen, 1982
Siphona vittata Curran, 1941
Siphona vixen Curran, 1941
Siphona wittei (Mesnil, 1952)
Siphona xanthogaster (O'Hara, 1984)

References

Tachininae
Tachinidae genera
Taxa named by Johann Wilhelm Meigen